Alexandre Luiz Giordano (born 26 June 1973 in São Paulo) is a Brazilian entrepreneur and politician, filiated to the Brazilian Democratic Movement (MDB). Currently, he is Senator for the state of São Paulo.

Political life

Giordano was elected in 2018 as first-substitute of Senator in the ticket of Major Olímpio and Marcos Pontes. After Olímpio's death, he was sworn in on 31 March 2021.

Before his membership to the Social Liberal Party, Giordano was member of the Green Party (PV) and the Brazilian Social Democracy Party (PSDB).

Giordano was pointed as a key figure of the deal between Brazil and Paraguay for the selling of exceeding Paraguyan energy from Itaipu Dam to the Léros company. This crisis almost led to an impeachment process against Paraguayan President Mario Abdo Benítez.

References

External links
 
 

1973 births
Living people
People from São Paulo
São Paulo (state) politicians
Social Liberal Party (Brazil) politicians
Green Party (Brazil) politicians
Brazilian Social Democracy Party politicians
21st-century Brazilian politicians
Brazilian people of Italian descent